Preciso de Ti is the fourth album in the live praise and worship series of contemporary worship music by Diante do Trono.

About the project 

In the pre-recording of the Preciso de Ti, the mining group released the Águas Purificadoras album, recorded at the Gameleira Park, in Belo Horizonte.

The Diante do Trono booked the Governor Magalhães Pinto Stadium, Mineirão, to record the fourth album - Preciso de Ti. In July 2001, with a stage of 42 feet, 210,000 people attended the event. It was the largest crowd ever recorded in history the stadium according to ADEMG (the government agency responsible for administering stages of Minas Gerais). Preciso de Ti also marked the history of Diante do Trono to receive three Indian girls recovered by India Project. Along with the whole group they sang and danced.

In this album also all tracks are written by Ana Paula Valadão.

Nowadays, the theme song "Preciso de Ti" is sung throughout Brazil, and even in other countries.

For this CD, Diante do Trono was recognized by Talent Trophy 2002, Grammy gospel music in Brazil, as Group of the Year and the title track of the CD Preciso de Ti won the award for Song of the Year.

According to the ABPD (Brazilian Association of Record Producers), the album Preciso de Ti sold 2 million copies around the Brazil and is the album of gospel music's best-selling history of Brazil and is in 15th position in the list of albums more sold in Brazil's history.

Like other tracks on the album, "Deus de Milagres", was written in a moment of sadness in the life of Ana Paula Valadão. Newly married, during the honeymoon, her husband Gustavo Bessa crashed his jet ski. The song is the most re-recorded song on the album according to the ministry of Diante do Trono. Two versions of the song in English, both written by Ana Paula Valadão, but with different lyrics, were created.

Track listing

References

2001 live albums
2001 video albums
Live video albums
Diante do Trono video albums
Diante do Trono live albums
Portuguese-language live albums